Big Blind Bluesy is an album by American guitarist Pat Donohue that was released in 1994.

Track listing
"Trouble in Mind" (Richard M. Jones) – 3:39
"I Never Cried" (Teddy Darby) – 3:03
"Long Tall Mama" (Big Bill Broonzy) – 3:09
"Michigan Water" (Jelly Roll Morton, Clarence Williams) – 4:29
"Too Tight Rag" (Blind Blake) – 3:00
"Blind Lemon Extract" (Pat Donohue) – 3:23
"Statesboro Blues" (Blind Willie McTell) – 3:35
"St. Louis Blues" (W. C. Handy) – 4:21
"Old Lady" (Donohue) – 1:27
"Weeping Willow Blues" (Fuller) – 2:58
"Kind Hearted Woman" (Robert Johnson) – 3:58
"Big Blind Bluesy" (Donohue) – 3:02

Personnel
Pat Donohue – guitar

References

1989 albums
Pat Donohue albums